"Whatever You Want" is a song performed by American recording artist Tina Turner from her ninth studio album, Wildest Dreams (1996). It was written by Arthur Baker, Fred Zarr, and Taylor Dayne and is noted for its different levels of energy and strong vocal performance, as well as its orchestral arrangement and complex production, courtesy of producer Trevor Horn.

The song was released as the lead single from the album and was the opening number on her Wildest Dreams Tour (1996). The song became a moderate success on the charts, reaching top ten in Czech Republic, Finland, Hungary and Italy, while reaching the top twenty in the Netherlands, New Zealand and Switzerland.

Critical reception
Ross Jones from The Guardian complimented the song as "epic", adding that "this is Trevor Horn's finest, most expensive sounding production in years". A reviewer from Music Week rated it four out of five, writing, "It's a simple song, but sung with all her usual gusto and a useful preview for her first new album in six years." Damien Mendis from the RM Dance Update gave the remix five out of five, stating that the original "has been gloriously prduced" by Horn. He added further that Todd Terry "has tackled the Phil Spector-style production and turned it into a way cool Frozen Sum mix that, although minimalist, is effective enough to keep dancefloors jumpin' and speakers pumpin'."

Music video
A music video was produced to promote the single, directed by French director, photographer, film producer and actor Stéphane Sednaoui. It features Turner with futuristic special effects surrounding her. The special effects become more vigorous as the song progresses.

Track listings
The 2 part CD single included an alternate mix of the track, an extended six-minute version and also a mix of Turner's cover version of Massive Attack's "Unfinished Sympathy", the Extended Olympic Mix. The promo 12" singles included club mixes of "Whatever You Want" by renowned remix producers Todd Terry and Arthur Baker. One of the Todd Terry mixes, Tee's Frozen Sum Mix, was later included on one of the European "Missing You" CD singles.

 European album version – 4:52
 Extended version (Credited as "album version" on certain European CD singles) – 6:03
 Alternative Mix – 4:48
 Tee's Frozen Sum Mix/Todd Terry Mix – 6:49
 Tod's Rubber Dub
 Todd's Mix 1
 Todd's Mix 2
 Todd's Mix 3  
 The Massive Jungle Mix (Arthur Baker) 
 Remix (Arthur Baker)  
 U.S. album version – 4:31

Charts

Weekly charts

Year-end charts

Other versions
The song was released as a 1998 single by Taylor Dayne from her album Naked Without You.  It was remixed by Soul Solution and was a hit in the clubs, peaking at number 6 on the US Billboard dance chart. Taylor Dayne's version was remixed and re-released on 7 May 2005 on the "Whatever You Want/Naked Without You: Remix EP" (CPD 59572)

References

External links
 

1996 singles
Tina Turner songs
Taylor Dayne songs
Music videos directed by Stéphane Sednaoui
Songs written by Fred Zarr
Song recordings produced by Trevor Horn
Songs written by Arthur Baker (musician)
Songs written by Taylor Dayne
1996 songs
Parlophone singles